The Massillon Farmers were an Ohio–Pennsylvania League minor league baseball team based in Massillon, Ohio that played in 1905. The team was managed by Walter Lipp. 

It was the first professional team to be based in Massillon since 1898 and is the most recent squad to come from that city.

References

Baseball teams established in 1905
Defunct minor league baseball teams
1905 establishments in Ohio
Defunct baseball teams in Ohio
Baseball teams disestablished in 1905
Ohio-Pennsylvania League teams